Celebrity Circus can refer to:

Celebrity Circus (Australian TV series), the original Celebrity Circus
Cirque de Celebrité, the United Kingdom version
Celebrity Circus (American TV series), the American version

See also
 Circus of the Stars